Wailadmi Passah (born 22 February 1988 in Jowai in Meghalaya) is an Indian football player. He is currently playing for Shillong Lajong F.C. in the I-League in India as a defender.

Career statistics

Club

References

 Wailadmi Passah at goal.com

Indian footballers
1988 births
Living people
People from West Jaintia Hills district
Shillong Lajong FC players
I-League players
Footballers from Meghalaya
Association football defenders